The Irondale River is a river in Haliburton County in Central Ontario, Canada. It is part of the Great Lakes Basin, and is a left tributary of the Burnt River.

The river flows begins at an unnamed lake in geographic Dudley Township in the municipality of Dysart et al, just southwest of the southern tip of Algonquin Provincial Park. It flows south, passes under Ontario Highway 118, then turns southwest, and passes over the High Falls. It continues southwest, passes into the municipality of Minden Hills, heads past the community of Irondale, and reaches its mouth at the Burnt River, northeast of the community of Kinmount. The Burnt River flows via the Kawartha Lakes, the Otonabee River and the Trent River to Lake Ontario.

From east of the community of Gooderham to the river mouth, the river is paralleled by Haliburton County Road 503.

Tributaries
Salerno Creek (left)
Bark Creek (right)
Gooderham Creek (right)
McCue Creek (right)
Laronde Creek (left)
Hadlington Creek (left)
Tory Creek (right)
Esson Creek (right)
Buckskin Creek (left)
Cope Creek (left)
Cardiff Creek (left)

See also
List of Ontario rivers

References

Sources

Rivers of Haliburton County